Adela of Milan (c. 975 – after 1012) was a northern Italian noblewoman. Through her marriage to Albert Azzo I, Margrave of Milan, Adela was Margravine of Milan.

Life
Adela's parents and dynasty are unknown, although it has been suggested that she was related to Lanfranc, Count of Piacenza and of Aucia (a medieval county which consisted of territory between Parma, Piacenza and Cremona). 
Adela first appears in the historical record in 1011, when she purchased goods from a deacon named Donninus. The following year, Adela bought 250 yokes of land from Donninus. Also in 1012 Adela granted 290 yokes of land to the church of Cremona, with the consent of her husband, and Count Lanfranc. These transactions may have been intended to protect their property from confiscation: Adela's husband Adalbert Azzo supported Arduin of Ivrea against the Emperor Henry II in the war for the Italian throne.

Marriage and children
With her husband, Adalbert Azzo, Adela had at least two children:
Albert Azzo II
Adela of Saluzzo, who married Anselm II, margrave of Saluzzo (d. before 1055)

Notes

References
U. Brunhofer, Arduin von Ivrea. Untersuchungen zum letzten italienischen Königtum des Mittelalters (Augsburg, 1999). 
A. Thiele, Erzählende genealogische Stammtafeln zur europäischen Geschichte Band III Europäische Kaiser-, Königs- und Fürstenhäuser (R.G. Fischer Verlag, 1994).
Luciano Chiappini, Gli Estensi (Varese, 1988).
E. Falconi, Le carte cremonesi dei secoli VIII-XII (Cremona, 1979), vol. 1.
Astegiano, Codice diplomatico cremonense 2 vols. (Turin, 1895–1898),

Sources
Medieval Lands Project: Modena and Ferrara.
Adele Markgräfin von Mailand (in German)

970s births
11th-century deaths
Year of birth uncertain
Year of death unknown
House of Este
Nobility from Milan
11th-century Italian nobility
11th-century Italian women